Terauchi (written: 寺内) is a Japanese surname. Notable people with the surname include:

, Japanese diver
, Imperial Japanese army marshal and commander of the Southern Expeditionary Army Group
, Japanese military officer, politician and Prime Minister of Japan
, Japanese baseball player
, Japanese rock guitarist
Yoko Terauchi (born 1954), Japanese artist
, Japanese actress and voice actress

Japanese-language surnames